The women's curling tournament of the 2018 Winter Olympics was held between 14 and 25 February 2018 at the Gangneung Curling Centre. Ten nations competed in a round robin preliminary round, and the top four nations at the conclusion of the round robin qualified for the medal round.

Teams
The teams are listed as follows:

Round robin standings

Round robin results
All draw times are listed in Seoul Time (UTC+09:00).

Summary

Draw 1
Wednesday, 14 February, 14:05

Draw 2
Thursday, 15 February, 09:05

Draw 3
Thursday, 15 February, 20:05

Draw 4
Friday, 16 February, 14:05

Draw 5
Saturday, 17 February, 09:05

Draw 6
Saturday, 17 February, 20:05

Draw 7
Sunday, 18 February, 14:05

Draw 8
Monday, 19 February, 09:05

Draw 9
Monday, 19 February, 20:05

Draw 10
Tuesday, 20 February, 14:05

Draw 11
Wednesday, 21 February, 09:05

Draw 12
Wednesday, 21 February, 20:05

Playoffs

Semifinals
Friday, 23 February, 20:05

Bronze medal game
Saturday, 24 February, 20:05

Gold medal game
Sunday, 25 February, 9:05

Final standings
The final standings are:

Statistics

Player percentages
Player percentages during round robin play are as follows:

Lead

Second

Third

Fourth

References

Curling at the 2018 Winter Olympics
Women's curling at the 2018 Winter Olympics
Women's events at the 2018 Winter Olympics
2018 in women's curling